The Red Fish (Spanish:Los peces rojos) is a 1955 Spanish thriller film directed by José Antonio Nieves Conde and written by Carlos Blanco with original idea by Carlos Blanco.

Plot
Ivón, a chorus girl, and Hugo, a failed writer, turn up at a provincial hotel on a stormy night. They have come from Madrid with Carlos, Hugo's son, born nineteen years earlier after a casual affair. They decide to lean over the cliffs to look at the angry waves down below – and Carlos falls to his death.

References

Bibliography
 Mira, Alberto. Historical Dictionary of Spanish Cinema. Scarecrow Press, 2010.

External links
 

1955 films
1950s Spanish-language films
1950s crime thriller films
Spain in fiction
Madrid in fiction
Asturias in fiction
Spanish black-and-white films
Films directed by José Antonio Nieves Conde
Spanish thriller films
1950s Spanish films